Cangrego Arriba is a barrio in the municipality of Carolina, Puerto Rico with a population of 17,041 in 2010.

Features
Cangrego Arriba is an urban area. Isla Verde is the neighborhood on the coast of Cangrego Arriba.

The Ritz-Carlton hotel in Cangrego Arriba sustained huge damage as a result of Hurricane Maria on September 20, 2017 and was set to reopen in 2022.

History
Puerto Rico was ceded by Spain in the aftermath of the Spanish–American War under the terms of the Treaty of Paris of 1898 and became an unincorporated territory of the United States. In 1899, the United States Department of War conducted a census of Puerto Rico finding that the population of Cangrejos barrio (as it was named at the time) was 367.

Gallery
Places and views of Cangrego Arriba:

See also

 List of communities in Puerto Rico

References

Barrios of Carolina, Puerto Rico